The World and Its Woman is a 1919 American silent drama film produced and distributed by Goldwyn Pictures and directed by Frank Lloyd. Opera singer Geraldine Farrar and her husband Lou Tellegen star.

Plot
As described in an adaptation of the film in the October 1919 issue of the film magazine Shadowland, singer Marcia Warren is in Russia with her father Robert Warren (Edward Connelly), who manages an oil field for Prince Michael Orbeliana the Elder (Alec B. Francis). The Elder Prince requests Marcia to sing for him, which she does well.

The young Prince Michael Orbeliana (Lou Tellegen) and Marcia fall in love, but she rejects his advances because the prince is already married and also could never marry an American. Years later, she is at the opera in Petrograd. The Prince's wife runs off with a count, and, with the Russian Revolution and fall of the Tsar, Michael (who is democratic at heart) leaves the city for the family estates in the Caucuses to deal with the peasants.

The Red leader Peter Poroschine comes to Marcia and professes his love for her, but she rejects him, and he threatens to kill Michael, who is back in the city. Peter has a woman named Feda guard Marcia, but after a struggle Marcia escapes. Marcia goes to Michael and brings him back to her apartment, but Peter also comes there. Peter is killed by Feda. No longer a prince, Michael and Marcia are now free to be together.

Cast

Preservation status
A copy of the film is held and preserved at Belgian archive, Cinematheque Royale de Belgique.

References

External links

Film still with Lou Tellegen and Geraldine Farrar at wisconsinhistory.org

1919 films
American silent feature films
Films directed by Frank Lloyd
Goldwyn Pictures films
1919 drama films
Silent American drama films
American black-and-white films
Surviving American silent films
1910s American films